The North Side Canal Company Slaughter House is a historic building in Jerome, Idaho. Built in 1910 of local lava rock it was listed on the National Register of Historic Places on September 8, 1983.

Description and history
It has a cement roof and two steel beams traverse the entire structure extending beyond the walls. Built by an unknown stonemason on an experimental/demonstration farm, the building was used to hang slaughtered animals. It is one of a group of industrial lava rock structures in the region demonstrating ingenuity and resourcefulness in using locally available building material. The design and materials functioned to provide a cool protected site for the storage of carcasses.

See also
 Historic preservation
 National Register of Historic Places listings in Jerome County, Idaho

References

1910 establishments in Idaho
Buildings and structures in Jerome County, Idaho
Industrial buildings and structures on the National Register of Historic Places in Idaho
Industrial buildings completed in 1910
National Register of Historic Places in Jerome County, Idaho